Science of Stupid is a comedic television series on the National Geographic Channel. The United Kingdom version of the show was initially hosted by Richard Hammond, later replaced by Dallas Campbell. Localised versions are produced in other territories with hosts such as Seth Herzog in the United States, Manish Paul in India, Ramon Bautista in the Philippines and Ymke Wieringa in the Netherlands. Versions are also broadcast in Latin America (one in Argentina and other in Mexico, with same title), Brazil and Germany. The first episode aired on 21 July 2014.  The second season of the show debuted on 2 March 2015.

Summary
In each episode, viral videos where the subjects typically take on dangerous or silly activities and end up inflicting unintended physical self-harm are analyzed in a comedic way for their underlying scientific principles. The series takes these clips as cautionary tales and real world examples of actions that should not be repeated by the audience.

Localised versions of the series utilize the same viral videos, however the hosts, language, references, and jokes differ by country.

Episodes
A total of 29 episodes have been telecast over two seasons in the UK. A total of 86 episodes were telecast in the Philippines over four seasons, each written by host Ramon Bautista and frequent collaborators Rohit Tharani and Ra Rivera.

Series overview

Season 1 (2014)

Season 2 (2015)

References

External links
 

Indian television shows